Yuri Alexandrovich Shundrov (6 June 1956 – 27 July 2018) was a Russian-Ukrainian former ice hockey goaltender.

Career
Shundrov began his career with Sokil Kyiv in the Soviet Championship League during the 1978–79 season. He played for Sokil exclusively until the 1990–91 season, which he split between them and KHK Crvena Zvezda of the Yugoslav Ice Hockey League. He then joined Khimik Voskresensk for the 1991–92 season and played for them until 1994, when he re-joined Sokil Kyiv. After three seasons spent with Sokil, he re-joined Khimik Voskresensk, who he played two more seasons with. Shundrov retired following the 1999–2000 season spent with Kryzhynka Kyiv and Rapid Bucuresti.

Internationally, Shundrov played two exhibition games for the USSR against Czechoslovakia in 1985 and played for the Ukraine men's national ice hockey team at the World Championships in 1995 (Pool C), 1997 (Pool C), 1998 (Pool B), and 1999 (Top Division).

Shundrov became the goaltending coach for HC CSKA Moscow of the Kontinental Hockey League in 2011. He had previously been goaltending coach for Metallurg Magnitogorsk from 2008 to 2010. From 2014 to 2017, he was goalkeeping coach at HC Sochi.

Honours
Ref.: 
Sokil Kyiv
 Ukrainian Hockey Championship (2): 1994–95, 1996–97
Soviet Union U20
 IIHF World Junior Championship: 1976
Soviet Union U19
 IIHF European Junior Championships: 1975

References

External links
 
 Юрий Шундров на сайте ХК ЦСКА
 Юрий Александрович Шундров —  Российский хоккей

1956 births
2018 deaths
Soviet ice hockey goaltenders
Ukrainian ice hockey goaltenders
Ukrainian people of Russian descent
Sportspeople from Penza
Dizel Penza players
HC Khimik Voskresensk players
KHK Red Star players
Sokil Kyiv players
Ukrainian ice hockey coaches
Soviet expatriate ice hockey players
Soviet expatriate sportspeople in Yugoslavia